Finley Solar Farm is a photovoltaic power station near Finley in New South Wales, Australia.

The solar farm has a seven-year power purchase agreement to supply electricity to Bluescope Steel.

References

Solar power stations in New South Wales